Tauscher Cronacher Professional Engineers is a 
New York-based provider of building related engineering services for the residential and commercial sectors, primarily building inspection services. It is the first professional engineering firm in the U.S. to set standards for home inspections and building safety.

Milestones
1957 - Tauscher Engineers is established.
1986 – Warren Cronacher purchases Tauscher Engineers and established Tauscher Cronacher Professional Engineers.
1989 -  Warren Cronacher, Arthur Tauscher and H.Alan Mooney found the National Academy of Building Inspections Engineers (NABIE). NABIE is an affinity group of The National Society of Professional Engineers (NPSE) and controls the certification for building inspection engineers.

Operations
Tauscher Cronacher has five main operational units: residential, commercial, association services, environmental services and forensic.

References

External links
 Tauscher Cronacher Professional Engineers Homepage

Engineering companies of the United States
Business services companies established in 1957
Companies based in New York City
1957 establishments in New York (state)